Darren Robert Yap (born 23 August 1967) is an Australian actor and director.

Early life
Yap was born in Sydney and grew up in the suburb of Cabramatta. He was the third child of a Malaysian-born father and his third-generation Australia-born ethically Chinese mother. Yap was educated at Newington College (1980–85). His father and sister are medical practitioners and his brother is a pharmacist. He initially applied to do the stage management course at the National Institute of Dramatic Art but he wasn’t  accepted. When the degree course in acting at UWS Theatre Nepean was first offered he chose to do that given his family all had University degrees. Following UWS Yap graduated from the Director's Course at NIDA.

Directing

Director

 The One, Ensemble Theatre 2022
 Jesus wants me for a sunbeam, Riverside's National Theatre of Parramatta, 2018
 Spot the Dog, CDP Productions, 2018
 Miracle City, The Theatre Division at the Sydney Opera House Studio, 2017
 The Great Wall (One Woman's Journey), Glowsticks Productions, Singapore, July 2017
 Diving for Pearls, Griffin Theatre Company, 2017
 Letters to Lindy, Merrigong Theatre
 New South Wales Pemier's Gala Concerts, Allphones Arena, Homebush, Venables Entertainment 2016
 Ladies Day, Griffin Theatre Company, 2016
 Opening of the National Gallery and Art Carnival, SG50 Celebrations, Singapore 2015
 Little Diana and the Big Fuzz, Bree Langridge in association with the Hayes Theatre, 2015
 Miracle City for Luckiest Productions at Hayes Theatre Co, 2014
 The Serpents Table, Sydney Festival, Griffin Theatre Company and Performance 4a, 2014
 A Murder is Announced, Louise Withers and Associates, 2013
 Robert Harling's Steel Magnolias and Joe DiPietro & Jimmy Roberts' I Love You, You're Perfect, Now Change for the Seymour Centre Subscription Season 2009 
 Chinese New Year Parade for City of Sydney, 2008
 Segment Director of The Closing Ceremony of the 15th Asian Games, Doha, 2006
 World Premiere of Dick Lee’s Man of Letters, Singapore Repertory Theatre
 World Premiere of The Admiral's Odyssey, Action Theatre, Singapore
 New South Wales Premier's Concert, Sydney Entertainment Centre, 2006 & 2007

Associate Director
 CAIRO MISR PRESHOW CELEBRATIONS, World Events, Julie Brooks, Cairo 2016
 KING KONG, LIVE ON STAGE, Global Creatures, World Premiere, 2013
 MISS SAIGON, Cameron Mackintosh: Westend 2014, Tokyo, 2014
 MISS SAIGON, Cameron Mackintosh: Japan 2012, Holland 2011, Korea 2010/2011
 MAMMA MIA! 10th ANNIVERSARY AUSTRALIAN TOUR, Judy Craymer, Michael Coppell and Louise Withers and Associates
 Miss Saigon tour for Cameron Mackintosh in Australia, Hong Kong, Singapore, Manchester, Dublin and Edinburgh, 2007 & 2008
 Closing Ceremony of the 2000 Summer Olympics Sydney, 2000

Resident Director
 Australasian tour of Mamma Mia in Perth, Adelaide, New Zealand, Hong Kong, Singapore, Brisbane and Melbourne
 World Premiere of The Boy from Oz starring Todd McKenney

Affiliate Director
 Sydney Theatre Company for David Williamson’s The Great Man and Katherine Thomson’s Navigating
 Western Australian Academy of Performing Arts for Miracle City

Acting

Theatre
 Constance Drinkwater and the Final days of Somerset
 Shadow and Splendour (Queensland Theatre Company)
 Songket (Griffin Theatre Company)
 Sydney Stories (Sydney Theatre Company)
 M. Butterfly (Melbourne Theatre Company)
 Capricornia (State Theatre Company of South Australia)
 The Quartet from Rigoletto (Ensemble Theatre)
 Cockroach Opera (Company B)
 Miss Saigon (Cameron Mackintosh)
 Chess (Victoria State Opera)
 The Wedding Song (NIDA Company)
 Anything Goes (Mike Walsh).

Television
 Over the Hill
 G. P.
 Embassy
 Bony
 Heartland
 Mission Impossible
 Richmond Hill
 Tanamera - Lion of Singapore
 Children of the Dragon
 The Leaving of Liverpool
 A Difficult Woman

Film
 The Home Song Stories (Tony Ayres)
 Floating Life (Clara Law)

Awards
Yap received a Green Room Award for Best Re-Staging by a Resident Artist for the world Premiere of The Boy from Oz.

References

1967 births
Living people
Male actors from Sydney
People educated at Newington College
National Institute of Dramatic Art alumni
Australian theatre directors
Australian male film actors
Australian male stage actors
Australian male television actors
Western Sydney University alumni